Tecomán is a city and seat of the municipality of Tecomán in the Mexican state of Colima, about 50 km south of the city of Colima. In the 2005 census the city had a population of 112,726 people. It is the third-largest community in the state of Colima. The municipality has an area of 834.77 km² (322.31 sq mi). Near the coast on Federal Highway 200, it is situated a rich agricultural industries region and is known as the "lime capital of the world".  Due to its soaring homicide rate, Tecomán became the deadliest municipality in Mexico in 2016.

Economy

The main economic activities of the area are: 

 Agriculture:  Limes, coconuts, tamarind, mango and bananas.
 Livestock:  Cattle, pigs, sheep, goats and apiculture.
 Industrial: Citrus and coconut agroindustry
 Mining: Dolomite, limestone and silver

Climate

Tourism

Nearby Beaches & recreational areas:

 Playa El Real. 10 km. south of Tecomán. Open sea, good surfing.
 Playa Boca de Pascuales. 12 km. from Tecomán. Surfing beach for the experienced. Enramadas serving fresh seafood.
 Playa de Tecuanillo. Narrow, fine-sanded, not-too-steep beach
 Laguna de Amela. Deep lagoon surrounded by lush vegetation.
 Laguna de Alcuzahue. Lagoon 8 km from  Tecomán. Visit the Crocodile reserve.
 Playa Paraiso. Open sea, Ramadas serving delicious freshly cooked food with Coconut drinks.  Usually a calm beach except during rainy season.
 Boca De Apiza.

References

External links
Ayuntamiento de Tecomán Official website
 Tecoman Info
https://web.archive.org/web/20080708062104/http://www.tecomense.com.mx/
Eco-volunteering projects with sea turtles.
Link to tables of population data from Census of 2005 INEGI: Instituto Nacional de Estadística, Geografía e Informática
Colima Enciclopedia de los Municipios de México

Populated places in Colima